Besides architecture, the Gothic Revival also manifested in furniture, metalworks, ceramics and other decorative arts during the 19th century. In France, it was the first reaction against the hegemony of Neoclassicism. At the end of the Restoration (1814–1830) and during the Louis-Philippe period (1830-1848), Gothic Revival motifs start to appear in France, together with revivals of the Renaissance and of Rococo. During these two periods, the vogue for medieval things led craftsmen to adopt Gothic decorative motifs in their work, such as bell turrets, lancet arches, trefoils, Gothic tracery and rose windows. This style was also as "Cathedral style" ("À la catédrale") or "Troubadour style" ("style troubadour").

For a long time, it was believed that romanticism was the cause of the return to the Gothic style in French decorative arts and that it was appropriate to look for its origin there. This is actually much further away. At the time of the French Revolution, an archaeologist, Alexandre Lenoir, was appointed curator of the Petits-Augustins depot, where sculptures, statues and tombs removed from churches, abbeys and convents had been transported. Lenoir organized the Museum of French Monuments (1795-1816). He was the first to restore the taste for the works of the Middle Ages, which progressed slowly to flourish a quarter of a century later. In fact, romanticism only spread to the public the themes dear to archaeologists.

Gallery

See also 
Gothic Revival architecture
Gothic literature
Historicism (art)

Notes 

Decorative arts
Visual arts genres
Interior design